Sierra Schmidt (born May 6, 1998) is an American competition swimmer.

Early life
Schmidt was born to Melinda and Joseph Schmidt in Scottsdale, Arizona. Schmidt graduated from the 21st Century Cyber Charter School in Exton, Pennsylvania in 2017.

Career
Schmidt won a gold medal at the 2015 Pan American Games in the 800 metre freestyle.  This performance set a Pan American Games record.

She was a multiple time junior national champion in 2014 and competed for the North Baltimore Aquatic Club from 2014-2016. She competed for the University of Michigan and Club Wolverine from 2017-2021 and graduated from the University of Michigan in May 2021, earning a BA in Film, Television, and Media, with honors. She was a six-time CSCAA All-American, Big Ten champion in the 800 free relay, as well as a two-time Big-Ten Distinguished Scholar and four-time CSCAA Scholar All-American during her time in Ann Arbor. Known as the “Dancing Queen” for her ritual of dancing behind the starting blocks prior to her races, she currently swims unattached and is sponsored by TYR.

Schmidt qualified for the 2016 U.S. Olympic Trials, where she finished 10th in the 400 meter freestyle and 8th in the 800 meter freestyle. At the postponed 2020 U.S. Olympic Trials, June 13–20, 2021, Sierra finished 6th in the 400 meter freestyle, 8th in the 800 meter freestyle, and 7th in the 1500 meter freestyle, one of only three swimmers to qualify for all three distance finals in the arduous Olympic prelim/final schedule. Her best time in the 1500 free from a month prior, 16:06.85, was ranked 19th in the world at that time.

References

External links
 
 

1998 births
Living people
Sportspeople from Scottsdale, Arizona
American female freestyle swimmers
Pan American Games gold medalists for the United States
Pan American Games medalists in swimming
Swimmers at the 2015 Pan American Games
Universiade medalists in swimming
Universiade bronze medalists for the United States
Universiade gold medalists for the United States
Medalists at the 2017 Summer Universiade
Medalists at the 2019 Summer Universiade
Medalists at the 2015 Pan American Games
21st-century American women
Michigan Wolverines women's swimmers